Inez is a feminine given name. It is the English spelling of the Spanish and Portuguese name Inés/Inês/Inez, the forms of the given name "Agnes".

Agnes is a woman's given name, which derives from the Greek word hagnē, meaning "pure" or "holy". The Latinized form of the Greek name is Hagnes, the feminine form of Hagnos, meaning "chaste" or "sacred".

People 
Given name
Inez (Tina Inez Gavilanes Granda, born 1977), Danish singer
Inéz (Ines Reingold-Tali), Estonian musician and artist
Inez Knight Allen (1876–1937), American Mormon missionary and politician
Inez Andrews (1929–2012), American singer
V. Inez Archibald (born 1945), British Virgin Islander politician and businesswoman
Inez Asher (1911–2006), American novelist and television writer
Mildred Inez Caroon Bailey (1919–2009), American military commander
Inez Barbour Hadley (1879–1971), American soprano singer
Inez Barron, American politician
Inez Baskin (1916–2007), American journalist
Inez Clough (1873–1933), American actress
Inez Courtney (1908–1975), American actress
Emily Inez Denny (1853–1918), American painter
Inez Dickens, American politician
Inez Fabbri (1931–1909), Austrian American singer
Inez Fischer-Credo (born 1928), Canadian equestrian
Inez De Florio-Hansen (born 1943), German linguist
Inez Foxx (born 1942), American singer
Inez Fung (born 1949), American climatologist
Inez García (1941–2003), American feminist
Inez M. Haring, (1875-1968) US botanist
Inez Hogan (1895–1973), American writer and illustrator
Inez Haynes Irwin (1873–1970), American author and politician
Inez James (1919–1993), American composer
Inez Y. Kaiser (born 1918), American entrepreneur
Inez van Lamsweerde (born 1963), Dutch photographer
Inez McCormack (1943–2013), Northern Irish trade union leader and human rights activist
Inez Milholland (1886–1916), American suffragist
Inez Palange (1889–1962), American actress
Inez Pearn (1913-1976), English novelist
Inez Pijnenburg (born 1949), Dutch politician
Inez Plummer, American actress
Inez Beverly Prosser (1895–1934), American psychologist
Inez Storer (born 1933), American painter
Inez Tenenbaum (born 1951), American attorney
Inez Trueman (1917–2015), Canadian politician
Inez Turner (born 1972), Jamaican sprinter
Inez Clare Verdoorn (1896–1989), South African botanist and taxonomist
Inez Viegas (born 1970), Brazilian actress
Inez Voyce (1924–2022), American baseball player
Inez Bjørg David (born 1982), a Danish actress and TV presenter working in Germany

Surname
Colette Inez (1931–2018), American poet
Maycon Carvalho Inez (born 1986), Brazilian footballer
Mike Inez (born 1962), American bass guitarist
Romain Inez (born 1988), French footballer
Inês de Castro (1325-1355, born in the Kingdom of Galicia), Queen consort of Portugal (posthumous)

Characters 
 Inez, the character played by Lumi Cavazos in Bottle Rocket
 Inez, the character played by Sofía Vergara in Chef
 Inez, a character from the children's television series Cyberchase
 Inez, the character played by Rachel McAdams in Midnight in Paris
 Inez Salinger, a character from the American soap opera One Life to Live
 Inès Serrano, a character in Jean-Paul Sartre's No Exit
 Little Inez Stubbs, the character played by Taylor Parks from Hairspray (2007)
 Inez Temple, the superhero known as Outlaw in Marvel Comics
 Inez Victor, née Christian, character in Joan Didion's Democracy
 Inez Wong, the mother of Amy Wong on the TV series Futurama
 Inez, a doll from the Groovy Girls doll line by Manhattan Toy
 Marsha Inez Dwanelle, a character from Billy Dilley's Super-Duper Subterranean Summer

Feminine given names
Portuguese feminine given names
Spanish feminine given names

it:Ines
pl:Inez
pt:Inês